The Abbey of Saint-Étienne, also known as Abbaye aux Hommes ("Men's Abbey") by contrast with the Abbaye aux Dames ("Ladies' Abbey"), is a former Benedictine monastery in the French city of Caen, Normandy, dedicated to Saint Stephen. It was founded in 1063 by William the Conqueror and is one of the most important Romanesque buildings in Normandy.

Founding

The concurrent founding of the Abbey of Saint-Étienne to the west of the Caen Castle and the Abbey of Sainte-Trinité (Abbaye aux Dames) to its East were to enhance the development of the new ducal capital, and may have been a result of the reconciliation process of William, Duke of Normandy (soon after to become William I, King of England), and Pope Leo IX. William fell out with the pope when he married his cousin Matilda of Flanders after 1049 despite Leo's interdiction. Lanfranc of Pavia, Prior of Bec Abbey, who himself had initially expressed concerns regarding the marriage, acted on William's behalf to secure Leo's forgiveness. For this successful service, Lanfranc was made abbot of Saint-Étienne, a position he held until his appointment to Canterbury in 1070.

The dedication took place in 1077. William's wife Matilda died in 1083 and was buried in the Abbaye aux Dames. After his own death in 1087 in Rouen, the body of King William was sent to Caen to be buried in Saint-Étienne, according to his wishes. The funeral, attended by the bishops and abbots of Normandy as well as his son Henry, was disturbed by the assertion of a citizen of Caen who alleged that his family had been illegally despoiled of the land on which the church was built. After hurried consultations the allegation was shown to be true, and the man was compensated. A further indignity occurred when the corpse was lowered into the tomb. The corpse was too large for the space, and when attendants forced the body into the tomb it burst, spreading a disgusting odour throughout the church.

William's tomb has been disturbed several times since 1087, the first time in 1522 when the grave was opened on orders from the papacy. The intact body was restored to the tomb at that time. In 1562, during the French Wars of Religion, the grave was again opened and the original tombstone of black marble, similar to that of Matilda in the Abbaye aux Dames, was destroyed. William's bones were scattered and lost, with the exception of one thigh bone. This lone relic was reburied in 1642 with a new marker, which was replaced 100 years later with a more elaborate monument. This tomb was again destroyed during the French Revolution, but was eventually replaced with the current early 19th-century ledger stone in white marble.

Architecture

The abbey was to be built in Caen stone, and construction began in 1066. For many decades during the 11th century, there was a mutually fruitful competition between Saint-Étienne and its sister building Sainte-Trinité. The west façade was built at the end of the 11th century.

An important feature added to both churches in about 1120 was the ribbed vault, used for the first time in France. The two abbey churches are considered forerunners of the Gothic. The original Romanesque apse was replaced in 1166 by an early Gothic chevet, complete with rose windows and flying buttresses. Nine towers and spires were added in the 13th century. The interior vaulting shows a similar progression, beginning with early sexpartite vaulting (using circular ribs) in the nave and progressing to quadripartite vaults (using pointed ribs) in the sanctuary.

Later history

As a consequence of the Wars of Religion, the high lantern tower in the middle of the church collapsed and was never rebuilt.

The Benedictine abbey was suppressed during the French Revolution and the abbey church became a parish church.

From 1804 to 1961, the abbey buildings accommodated a prestigious high school, the Lycée Malherbe. During the Normandy Landings, inhabitants of Caen found refuge in the church; on the rooftop there was a red cross, made with blood on a sheet, to show that it was a hospital (to avoid bombings).

See also
 French Romanesque architecture

References

Further reading

 Conant, Kenneth J., 
 Bouet, Georges, 1868: Analyse architecturale de l'abbaye de Saint-Etienne de Caen. Caen: Le Blanc-Hardel
 Davy, R., 1954: Le grand orgue de L'Abbaye aux Hommes à Caen. Caen: Caron
 Gouhier, P., Fortier, J.A., 1974: L'Abbaye aux Hommes : Saint-Etienne de Caen. Nancy: Cefag
 Hippeau, Célestin, 1855: L'Abbaye de Saint-Étienne de Caen, 1066-1790. Caen: A. Hardel
 Decauville Lachênée, Abel, 1895: Le Lycée et l'Abbaye de St-Étienne de Caen. Caen: Chez tous les libraires
 Sauvage, R.N., 1911: Le Fonds de l'abbaye de Saint-Étienne de Caen aux archives du Calvados. Caen: H. Delesques

External links
 Visiting information 

Saint-Etienne, Caen
Roman Catholic churches in Caen
Saint-Etienne, Caen
Romanesque architecture in Normandy
Saint-Etienne, Caen
Tourist attractions in Normandy
11th-century establishments in France